Ars Poetica may refer to:

 "Ars Poetica" (Horace), a c. 19 BC poem by Horace 
 "Ars Poetica" (Archibald MacLeish), a 1926 poem by Archibald MacLeish
 Ars poetica (Israel), an Israeli poetry collective